Karl Eusebius (11 April 1611 – 5 April 1684) was the Prince of Liechtenstein. He inherited this title in 1627 from his father Karl I. He was 16 and thus considered underage, and his uncles Prince Gundakar and Maximillian acted as regents until 1632. From 1639 to 1641 Karl was Chief Captain of High and Low Silesia.

After the Thirty Years' War Karl effectively restored his dominions economically. Karl was also an extensive patron of architecture of the period. He formed the early plans for Plumlov Castle, which in fact his son the future Hans-Adam I oversaw the construction of.

He died in Schwarzkosteletz.

Marriage and issue
Karl married his niece, Princess Johanna Beatrix von Dietrichstein-Nikolsburg ( – 26 March 1676) on 6 August 1644. They had nine children:

Princess Eleonora Maria (1647 – 7 August 1704).
Princess Anna Maria (1648–1654).
Princess Maria Theresia (1649–1716).
Princess Johanna Beatrix (1650–1672); Married Maximilian II, Prince of Liechtenstein (1641–1709).
Prince Franz Dominik (died 1652).
Prince Karl Joseph (died 1653).
Prince Franz Eusebius (1654–1655).
Princess Cecilia (died 1655).
Prince Johann Adam Andreas (known as Hans-Adam I, Prince of Liechtenstein) (1662–1712).

Ancestry

In popular culture 
Karl Eusebius plays a prominent role in several of the works in the 1632 series of alternative history novels and stories.

References

External links 

Princely House of Liechtenstein
Nevojice
Genealogie on line

1611 births
1684 deaths
Princes of Liechtenstein